Eilam or Eillam is an Israeli name. Notable people with this name include:

Avraham Eilam-Amzallag (born 1941), Israeli musician and composer
Barak Eilam, Israeli electrical engineer and businessman
Eldad Eilam, author of Reversing: Secrets of Reverse Engineering
Esther Eillam (born 1939), Israeli feminist
Tamar Eilam, Israeli-American computer scientist
Uzi Eilam, Israeli general and director of the Israel Atomic Energy Commission